The  is a 14.3 km Japanese railway line operated by the third-sector railway operator  between  and , all within Hitachinaka, Ibaraki. It is the only railway line operated by the Hitachinaka Seaside Railway. The line was formerly operated by Ibaraki Kōtsū until 2008.

Operations
Train services are normally formed of single-car diesel units, increased to two-car formations during the morning peak.

Stations

Rolling stock
, the railway operates a fleet of eight single-car diesel railcars, as follows.

 KiHa 11 x3 (car numbers KiHa  to 7, since 30 December 2015)
 KiHa 20 x1 (car number 205, former Mizushima Rinkai Railway KiHa 20, same as JNR KiHa 20)
 MiKi 300 x1 (car number 300-103, former Miki Railway MiKi 300)
 KiHa 3710 x2 (car numbers 3710-01 and )
 KiHa 37100 x1 (car number 37100-03)

In April 2015, three former JR Central KiHa 11 diesel cars, KiHa 11-123/203/204, were sold to the Hitachinaka Kaihin Railway, becoming KiHa , Kiha , and KiHa  respectively. Two more KiHa 11-200 series cars, formerly owned by Tokai Transport Service Company (TKJ) in Aichi Prefecture, were purchased by the Hitachinaka Kaihin Railway in 2015 and 2016. Of these, KiHa 11-201 was moved by road to the Hitachinaka Kaihin Railway in September 2015, and Kiha 11-202 was moved in March 2016.

Former rolling stock
 KiHa 22 x1 (car number 222, former Haboro Mining Railway KiHa 22, same as JNR KiHa 22)
 KiHa 2000 x2 (car numbers 2004 and 2005, former Rumoi Railway KiHa 2000, same as JNR KiHa 22)

KiHa 2004 was withdrawn from service in December 2015, and sold to the Heisei Chikuhō Railway in Kyushu in 2016.

History

The  was established on 18 November 1907, and the line was opened from Katsuta 
to Nakaminato on 25 December 1913, using steam haulage. The entire line to Ajigaura was completed on 17 July 1928.

The Minato Line was the only railway line operated by Ibaraki Kōtsū, whose main business was bus transport. Because of its severe financial situation, Ibaraki Kōtsū decided to withdraw from railway operation. In September 2007, Ibaraki Kōtsū and the city of Hitachinaka agreed to transfer the line to a third-sector (funded jointly by local government and private sector) company, later incorporated as Hitachinaka Seaside Railway. From 1 April 2008, the line became the Hitachinaka Seaside Railway Minato Line.

From 6 April 2010, all train services became one-man operation.

The line was damaged by the 11 March 2011 Great East Japan earthquake, but the entire line was reopened for business from 23 July of the same year.

A new station which will be located near Hitachi Seaside Park is going to open and be extended Minato Line to the station in 2024.。

See also
List of railway companies in Japan
List of railway lines in Japan
Michinori Holdings (This firm invests this railway company through Ibaraki Kotsu)

References

External links 

  

Railway lines in Japan
Rail transport in Ibaraki Prefecture
1067 mm gauge railways in Japan
1913 establishments in Japan
Japanese third-sector railway lines